Mariano Puerta didn't defend his last year title. He lost to Ricardo Hocevar in the first round.
Marcos Daniel won against Horacio Zeballos in the final 4–6, 7–6(5), 6–4.

Seeds

Draw

Final four

Top half

Bottom half

References
 Main Draw
 Qualifying Draw

Seguros Bolivar Open Bogota - Singles
2009 S